Else Feldmann (25 February 1884 – 1942) was an Austrian writer, playwright, poet, socialist journalist, and victim of the Holocaust.

She grew up in Leopoldstadt as the daughter of poor Jewish parents with her six siblings. She attended college, but after her father lost his job she was forced to leave school to work in a factory. In 1908, she became a contributor to the socialist newspaper Arbeiter-Zeitung and went on to co-found a socialist writers group, Vereinigung  sozialistischer Schriftsteller, with Jewish socialist poet Josef Luitpold Stern, communist author, poet, essayist, and songwriter Fritz Brügel, Jewish anarchist and socialist lyricist and poet Theodor Kramer, and early science fiction author Rudolf Brunngraber.

Feldmann was able to develop stories from her articles into novels to reach a wider audience with her socialist message.  She began working full-time for the Arbeiter-Zeitung in 1923 until the newspaper, along with other socialist and communist political activity, was forbidden by the austrofascist Fatherland Front Party in 1934. On June 14, 1942, Feldman was captured by the Gestapo and sent to Sobibór extermination camp, where she was murdered.

Books 
 Lowenzahn: Eine Kindheit
 Liebe ohne Hoffnung
 Der Leib der Mutter
 Martha und Antonia

References 

Austrian women writers
Austrian women poets
Austrian Jews who died in the Holocaust
Austrian people who died in Sobibor extermination camp
Austrian civilians killed in World War II
People from Leopoldstadt
1884 births
1942 deaths
20th-century women writers
20th-century Austrian writers
20th-century Austrian journalists
Jewish dramatists and playwrights